Ken Kupsch (born 28 October 1938) is a former  Australian rules footballer who played with St Kilda in the Victorian Football League (VFL).

Notes 

Friend and mentor to Bill Mcilroy

External links 

Living people
1938 births
Australian rules footballers from Victoria (Australia)
St Kilda Football Club players